The onshore oil and gas resources in the United Kingdom are located in a number of provinces corresponding to prospective sedimentary basins. Provinces and Basins (from south to north) include the Wessex-Channel Basin, Weald Basin, Worcester Basin, Cheshire Basin, East Midlands Province, West Lancashire Basin, NE England Province, Northumberland-Solway Basin, Midland Valley of Scotland, and the Orcadian Basin.

Background 
The Petroleum Act 1998 confers all rights to the UK's petroleum resources to the Crown. These rights are devolved to governments and government bodies. The licensing of exploration and development of England's onshore oil and gas resources is regulated by the Oil & Gas Authority. The OGA can grant licences that confer exclusive rights to search and bore for and get petroleum, over a limited area for a limited time. 

The Scotland Act 2016 devolved oil and gas licensing powers to the Scottish Government with effect from 9 February 2018.

In addition, the Office of Unconventional Gas and Oil (OUGO), is a UK Government office that promotes the safe, responsible and environmentally sound recovery of the UK's unconventional reserves of gas and oil.

The onshore oil and gas industry is represented by the United Kingdom Onshore Oil and Gas (UKOOG) industry body.

UK onshore oil and gas fields 
A list of current and historic UK onshore oil and gas fields is given in the table.

See also 

 List of oil and gas fields in the North Sea
 Geology of the United Kingdom
 Economy of the United Kingdom
 East Midlands Oil Province
 Shale gas in the United Kingdom
 Hydraulic fracturing in the United Kingdom
 Underground coal gasification
 Coal bed methane

References 

Oil fields of Europe
Natural gas fields
Lists of oil and natural gas fields
Oil fields of England